Ninetet (Yoshi's) 1997 Vol. 4 is a live album by composer and saxophonist Anthony Braxton with a ninetet, recorded at the Yoshi's in 1997 and released on the Leo label in 2007 as a double CD.

Reception

The Allmusic review by arwulf arwulf stated "When in August 1997 the Anthony Braxton Ninetet performed live at Yoshi's in Oakland, California, the methodology he called Ghost Trance Music still contained elements of its "first species" stage, in which the primary rhythmic pulse was generated in honor of the First Nation Native American drum ritual tradition. Although by this time Braxton's Ghost Trance Music had been evolving for little more than two years, greater systematic variability is evident throughout the intricate and complex "Composition N. 213" and "Composition N. 214," which may reflect GTM's other primal influence, the Indonesian Shadow Puppet Theater tradition. ... This is the Braxton Ninetet's fourth and final recording made during that five-day engagement at Yoshi's in 1997". On All About Jazz, John Eyles noted "As this release is the fourth volume of the Yoshi's recordings, it seems unlikely to attract listeners who have not already heard the previous volumes. The scored music is entirely consistent with those preceding releases; highly structured and rhythmically tight, it gets into a groove and then stays there for a long time. There are solos on top of the repeated patterns that define each composition, but that is where they are—on top".

Track listing
All compositions by Anthony Braxton

Disc one
 "Composition N. 213" – 56:14

Disc two
 "Composition N. 214" – 58:40

Personnel
 Anthony Braxton – E♭ alto saxophone, F alto saxophone, soprano saxophone, C melody saxophone, flute, B♭ clarinet, bass clarinet, contrabass clarinet
Brandon Evans – tenor saxophone, C soprano saxophone, sopranino saxophone, bass clarinet, flute
James Fei – soprano saxophone, alto saxophone, bass clarinet
Jackson Moore – alto saxophone, B♭ clarinet
André Vida – tenor saxophone, alto saxophone, soprano saxophone, baritone saxophone
J. D. Parran – soprano saxophone, bass saxophone, flute
Kevin O'Neil – electric guitar
Joe Fonda – bass
Kevin Norton – drums, marimba, percussion

References

Anthony Braxton live albums
2007 live albums
Leo Records live albums